Leonard Joseph Fournette III (born January 18, 1995) is an American football running back who is a free agent. He played college football for the LSU Tigers, and was drafted by the Jacksonville Jaguars with the fourth overall pick in the 2017 NFL Draft.

Fournette had near-unprecedented hype headed into college in 2014 after an outstanding career at St. Augustine High School in New Orleans. He won the 2013 USA Today High School Football Offensive Player of the Year and was named the top-ranked recruit in 2014 senior class according to ESPN, 247Sports.com, and CBS Sports. At LSU, he was a consensus All-America selection following his sophomore season in 2015, after setting school single-season records with 1,953 rushing yards and 22 rushing touchdowns, and leading the country with 162.8 rushing yards per game. Various experts regarded him as the best player in college football.

Upon being drafted by the Jaguars, Fournette had immediate success, including rushing for over 1,000 yards in his rookie season. However, he struggled with several injuries and suspensions and as a result, his relationship with the franchise soured, eventually leading to his release after just three seasons with the team. He then signed with the Buccaneers, with whom he played a large part in winning Super Bowl LV over the Kansas City Chiefs.  He was the team's primary starter for most of the 2021 season, but a late-season injury kept him out of the last 3 games of the regular season, as well as part of the playoffs.

Early years
Raised in the 7th Ward of New Orleans by his parents Leonard Jr. and Lory, Fournette grew up in a troubled area that was often affected by violence and gang activity, especially after Hurricane Katrina hit in 2005. Fournette credited Katrina as kick-starting his football career after he moved to Houston and back within a year because of the hurricane evacuation. He also credits his mother's Catholic faith with getting the family through the recovery process.

When he came back to New Orleans he played football at St. Augustine High School, and competed in track and field. His 200 metres regional mark of 21.57 seconds is fastest in 4A, and his 10.68 in the 100 metres is only .02 off the best time. He also competed in the 4 × 100 metres relay and 4 × 200 metres relay.

On the varsity football team, he was a starter since his freshman year and compiled 7,619 rushing yards and 88 rushing touchdowns for his career. He rushed for more than 2,500 yards and 30 touchdowns his freshman season, and became the first-ever freshman to earn a scholarship offer from Louisiana State. His sophomore year ended with 1,900 yards rushing and 27 touchdowns. As a junior, he registered 2,135 rushing yards and 31 touchdowns and was an LFCA Class 4A First-team All-State honoree. In his senior year, Fournette ran for 1,792 yards and 16 touchdowns and added 45 receptions for 745 yards and six scores. Early in the season, he had a heralded performance with two touchdowns and 262 yards rushing against Malachi Dupre's John Curtis Christian, which was nationally televised by ESPN2. St. Augustine ended the season with a 9–2 record and an appearance in the LHSAA Division I semifinal game, where they were upset 31–28 by Archbishop Rummel High School. Fournette was named Louisiana's 2013 Mr. Football by the Louisiana Sports Writers Association, and also was selected as an All-American by Parade and USA Today, as well as USA Today Offensive Player of the Year, the first from Louisiana since Ryan Perrilloux in 2004. After the season, Fournette participated in the Under Armour All-America Game where he caught a 36-yard touchdown pass and rushed for 43 yards on nine carries.

Unanimously regarded as the best running back prospect of his class, Fournette was one of the most highly recruited players ever to come out of Louisiana. ESPN ranked him as the No. 1 recruit in the class of 2014, as did Scout.com. At the 2014 Under Armour All-America Game, Fournette announced his decision to attend Louisiana State University (LSU).

College career
Fournette attended and played college football for LSU from 2014 to 2016 under head coaches Les Miles and Ed Orgeron.

Freshman season
Fournette's college career was preceded by very high expectations and hype, and he was often called "the next Adrian Peterson". In his collegiate debut against the Wisconsin Badgers on August 30, 2014, Fournette ran for 18 yards on eight carries. After the game, Tigers head coach Les Miles downplayed the Fournette hype. "First games are not to be comparable to his 30th game," said Miles. "Expectations are unrealistic."
In his second game, against the Sam Houston State Bearkats, Fournette rushed for 92 yards on 13 attempts and scored his first collegiate rushing touchdown. In the fifth week of the season, the New Mexico State Aggies traveled to Death Valley to face the #17 LSU Tigers, and Fournette ran for 122 yards on 18 carries and scored two touchdowns. This effort put Fournette at the top of the Tigers' rushing list for the season. On October 11 against SEC rival Florida, Fournette rushed the ball 27 times for 140 yards and two touchdowns to help LSU secure a 30–27 last-second win in The Swamp. Against undefeated and #3 Ole Miss, who led the nation in stopping the run, Fournette shook off an early goal line fumble and rushed 23 times for 113 yards to go along with two receptions for 41 yards. LSU ran the ball 12 times for 92 yards on a 13-play, 95-yard touchdown drive to upset the Rebels by a score of 10–7 in Death Valley. Fournette finished the season against Notre Dame in the 2014 Music City Bowl with 11 carries for 143 yards and two touchdowns. In addition, he had a 100-yard kickoff return for a touchdown in the loss to the Fighting Irish.

Sophomore season

Fournette started his sophomore season with a strong performance of 159 rushing yards and three touchdowns against Mississippi State. In the next game, a victory over Auburn, he finished with 228 rushing yards and three touchdowns. He rushed for a career-high 244 yards and two touchdowns against Syracuse in the Carrier Dome, six yards shy of tying Alley Broussard's school record of 250 yards against Ole Miss in 2004. Fournette had an 87-yard touchdown run nullified by an illegal formation call late in the game. The following week, against Eastern Michigan, Fournette rushed for 233 yards, becoming the first player in Southeastern Conference (SEC) history to rush for 200 or more yards in three straight games. Against Western Kentucky, Fournette ran for 150 yards, his ninth consecutive 100+ yards rushing game, a streak that dated back to the Texas A&M game in late November 2014. He tied a school record originally established by Charles Alexander in 1978. Fournette's streak ended the next game against rival Alabama, the nation's best rushing defense, at Bryant–Denny Stadium. He was held to 31 yards on 19 attempts, as the Crimson Tide handed LSU its first loss of the season. In the 2015 Texas Bowl, Fournette ran for 212 yards and scored five total touchdowns as the Tigers defeated Texas Tech, 56–27.

In his sophomore season, Fournette set school records with 1,953 rushing yards and 22 rushing touchdowns. With an average of 162.8 rushing yards per game, he won the NCAA rushing title, awarded to the player with the highest rushing yards per game average each season. He finished sixth in Heisman Trophy voting, earning 110 points. He earned consensus All-America honors as he was named to the first-team by three official selectors: the Associated Press (AP), the Walter Camp Football Foundation, and the Football Writers Association of America. SEC coaches, the Associated Press, and ESPN.com each named Fournette to their All-SEC first-team.

Junior season
Entering his junior season, Fournette was expected to contend for the Heisman Trophy, and was one of the preseason favorites to win the award. During a scrimmage game prior to the 2016 season, Fournette sustained a high ankle sprain, but was well enough to return for the season opener against Wisconsin at Lambeau Field. Late in the game against Wisconsin, he bruised the same ankle and missed the next week's game against Jacksonville State as a result. He re-injured it against SEC West rival Auburn on September 24 in a 101-yard rushing effort, causing him to miss the next two games. On October 22, his first game back, Fournette rushed for 284 yards and three touchdowns against Ole Miss to set a new single-game school record for rushing yards. His school record was surpassed later in the season by Derrius Guice by one yard. With his ankle still not fully healed, Fournette was not expected to play against Florida on November 19, and did not suit up for pregame warm-ups. However, after a pregame scuffle between the teams in which Fournette shoved a Florida assistant coach, LSU head coach Ed Orgeron granted him permission to play. Still visibly bothered by the injury, he managed only 40 yards on 12 carries and did not play in the fourth quarter. Due to the injury, he did not travel with the team to College Station to face Texas A&M in the final game of the regular season. He finished his junior season having carried 129 times for 843 yards and eight touchdowns in seven games.

On December 5, 2016, Fournette announced his intention to enter the 2017 NFL Draft. To avoid injury, his coach told him to skip the 2016 Citrus Bowl, which LSU won over Louisville. Fournette finished his college career having rushed for 3,830 yards, the fourth-most by a player in LSU history behind Charles Alexander, Dalton Hilliard, and Kevin Faulk. His 40 rushing touchdowns are tied for third most in school history with Alexander and behind Hilliard and Faulk.

College statistics

Professional career
Coming out of college, Fournette was highly touted as a top ten pick in the upcoming draft and was ranked as the third best prospect going into the NFL Combine. He arrived at the NFL combine weighing in five pounds heavier than his playing weight in college and opted to only participate in the vertical and 40-yard dash. At LSU's Pro Day, he opted to only partake in positional drills. He was ranked the top overall running back prospect by NFLDraftScout.com, and second behind Florida State's Dalvin Cook by Pro Football Focus and Sports Illustrated.

Jacksonville Jaguars
The Jacksonville Jaguars selected Fournette fourth overall in the 2017 NFL Draft. He was the first running back taken in that year's draft. On May 17, 2017, the Jacksonville Jaguars signed Fournette to a four-year, $27 million contract with an $18 million signing bonus.

2017 season
Fournette made his regular season debut on September 10, 2017, against the Houston Texans at NRG Stadium. He rushed for 100 yards and a touchdown on 26 carries as the Jaguars won 29–7. In Week 4, against the New York Jets, Fournette recorded a 10-yard reception in the first quarter for his first career receiving touchdown. In Week 5 against the Pittsburgh Steelers, Fournette posted an impressive performance with 181 rushing yards, including a Jaguars franchise-record 90-yard run in the fourth quarter, and two touchdowns as the Jaguars won 30–9. In Week 6 against the Los Angeles Rams, Fournette carried 21 times for 130 yards, including a 75-yard touchdown run on the Jaguars' first play from scrimmage. He left the game in the fourth quarter with a minor ankle injury as the Jaguars lost to the Rams, 27–17. Because of the ankle injury, he was ruled out for Week 7. Following a bye week, more trouble arose as Fournette was declared inactive for Week 9 against the Cincinnati Bengals as he violated team rules.

In 13 games and starts, Fournette finished his rookie year with 1,040 rushing yards and nine rushing touchdowns along with 302 receiving yards and a receiving touchdown. He was ranked 58th by his peers on the NFL Top 100 Players of 2018.

The Jaguars finished the 2017 season with a 10–6 record, clinching the AFC South. In the Wild Card Round against the Buffalo Bills, Fournette struggled, rushing for 57 yards on 21 carries as the Jaguars won 10–3. In the Divisional Round against the Pittsburgh Steelers, he briefly left the game with an ankle injury, but returned and finished with 109 yards and three touchdowns as the Jaguars won 45–42. The following week, in the AFC Championship against the New England Patriots, Fournette ran for 76 yards and a touchdown, but the Jaguars lost 24–20.

2018 season
Fournette injured his hamstring during the season-opening 20–15 victory against the New York Giants. He missed the next two games before returning against the New York Jets, where he aggravated the injury and was ruled out indefinitely. After missing four more games, he returned against the division rival Indianapolis Colts, rushing for 53 yards and a touchdown with 56 receiving yards and a receiving touchdown as the Jaguars narrowly lost 29–26. Against the Buffalo Bills, Fournette had his best game of the season, rushing for 95 yards and two touchdowns. However, after a Donte Moncrief reception that was initially ruled a touchdown in the third quarter, Fournette got into a fistfight with Bills defender Shaq Lawson as part of a brawl that broke out between the Jaguars and Bills, and the two were subsequently ejected from the game. Without Fournette, the Jaguars lost 24–21. He was suspended one game the following day for the fight.

Fournette finished the 2018 season with 439 rushing yards and five rushing touchdowns to go along with 22 receptions for 185 receiving yards and a receiving touchdown.

2019 season

During a Week 4 26–24 road victory against the Denver Broncos, Fournette rushed for 225 yards, including an 81-yard rush, marking the first time in a single NFL game where he had over 200 rushing yards. In the next game against the Carolina Panthers, he rushed 23 times for 108 yards and his first rushing touchdown of the season in the 34–27 road loss. During Week 7 against the Cincinnati Bengals, Fournette finished with 131 rushing yards as the Jaguars won 27–17. In Week 12 against the Tennessee Titans, Fournette rushed 24 times for 97 yards and two touchdowns and caught nine passes for 62 yards in the 42–20 loss. Overall, in the 2019 season, Fournette had 1,152 rushing yards and three rushing touchdowns to go along with 76 receptions for 522 receiving yards.

On May 1, 2020, the Jaguars declined the fifth-year option on Fournette's contract, which would have made him a free agent in 2021. On August 31, 2020, the Jaguars waived Fournette after being unable to trade him.

Tampa Bay Buccaneers

2020 season
On September 6, 2020, Fournette signed a one-year contract with the Tampa Bay Buccaneers.

During Week 2 against the Carolina Panthers, Fournette finished with 12 carries for 103 rushing yards and two rushing touchdowns, including a 46-yard rushing touchdown with 1:56 remaining to seal the game for the Buccaneers 31–17. Overall, in a backfield where Ronald Jones II got a majority of the carries, Fournette recorded 97 carries for 367 rushing yards and six rushing touchdowns to go along with 36 receptions for 233 receiving yards in the 2020 season.

In the Wild Card Round against the Washington Football Team, Fournette rushed for 93 yards and a touchdown and caught four passes for 39 yards during the 31–23 win.
In the Divisional Round of the playoffs against the New Orleans Saints, Fournette rushed for 63 yards and recorded 5 catches for 44 yards and a touchdown during the 30–20 win.
In the NFC Championship against the Green Bay Packers, Fournette rushed for 55 yards and a touchdown during the 31–26 win. In Super Bowl LV against the Kansas City Chiefs, Fournette rushed for 89 yards and a touchdown and recorded four catches for 46 yards during the 31–9 win. Fournette's impressive playoff performance earned him the nickname "Playoff Lenny", which later evolved to "Lombardi Lenny" after scoring a touchdown in the Buccaneers Super Bowl victory over the Kansas City Chiefs. He became the third player in NFL history to score touchdowns in four games in a single postseason.

2021 season
On March 31, 2021, Fournette re-signed with the Buccaneers on a one-year deal worth $3.25 million.

Fournette was one of the first players to change his jersey number after the National Football League uniform numbers rule had changed in April 2021. He decided to wear number 7, which he previously wore at LSU during his college career.

In Week 6, against the Philadelphia Eagles, Fournette had 127 scrimmage yards and two rushing touchdowns. Against the Indianapolis Colts in Week 12, Fournette rushed for 100 yards, had 31 receiving yards, and had four total touchdowns in the 38–31 win, earning NFC Offensive Player of the Week. He suffered a hamstring injury in Week 15 and was placed on injured reserve on December 23, 2021. Fournette finished the 2021 season with 812 rushing yards and eight rushing touchdowns to go along with 69 receptions for 454 receiving yards and two receiving touchdowns.

Fournette was activated on January 22, 2022. In the Divisional Round against the Los Angeles Rams, he had 107 scrimmage yards and two rushing touchdowns in the 30–27 loss.

2022 season
On March 23, 2022, Fournette re-signed with the Buccaneers on a three-year, $21 million contract. In Week 1, Fournette rushed for 127 yards on 21 carries in a 19–3 victory over Dallas. In Week 5, against Atlanta, he had 139 scrimmage yards, one rushing touchdown, and one receiving touchdown in the 21–15 victory.

On March 17, 2023, Fournette was released by the Buccaneers.

NFL career statistics

Regular season

Postseason

NFL records
 Youngest player with a rushing touchdown of at least 90 yards (22 years, 263 days)

Jaguars franchise records
 First player to score a scrimmage touchdown in each of his first six career games
 First player to rush for at least 100 yards in his NFL debut
 Longest rushing play: 90 yards (October 8, 2017, against the Pittsburgh Steelers)

Esports career
In 2021, Fournette signed with Complexity Gaming.

Personal life
Fournette's younger brother, Lanard, also played at LSU.

On June 8, 2020, Fournette led a peaceful march of about 700 people, including police officers, in downtown Jacksonville to protest the murder of George Floyd.

See also
 LSU Tigers football statistical leaders

References

External links

 
 
 Tampa Bay Buccaneers bio
 LSU Tigers bio

1995 births
Living people
Players of American football from New Orleans
American football running backs
St. Augustine High School (New Orleans) alumni
LSU Tigers football players
All-American college football players
Jacksonville Jaguars players
Tampa Bay Buccaneers players